Hasina: A Daughter's Tale is a 2018 Bangladeshi independent historical docudrama directed by Piplu Khan, based on the life of Sheikh Hasina, the tenth Prime Minister of Bangladesh. The film was jointly produced by the Centre for Research and Information and Applebox Films. It stars Sheikh Hasina as herself in the title role, and her younger sister Sheikh Rehana as herself.

The film covers and refers to the assassination of Hasina's father Sheikh Mujibur Rahman along with most of her family in 1975.

Cast
Sheikh Hasina as herself and narrator
Sheikh Rehana as herself and narrator

Production
The film is an Applebox Films project. The cinematography of the film has been done by Sadik Ahmed, and editing by Navnita Sen.

Music
The music was scored by Debojyoti Mishra. The film has two more tracks, one of them sung by Piplu himself.

Release
The premiere of “Hasina: A Daughter's Tale”, a docudrama on the life of Bangladeshi Prime Minister Sheikh Hasina, was held at Star Cineplex located at Bashundhara City Shopping Complex in Dhaka on 15 November 2018 and also the film was internationally released at Star Cineplex on November 16, 2018. The trailer of the film was released on all social media platforms on the 71st birthday of Sheikh Hasina on 28 September 2018.

References

External links

Hasina: A Daughter's Tale at CRI
Hasina: A Daughter's Tale

2018 films
Bengali-language Bangladeshi films
2018 biographical drama films
Bangladeshi biographical drama films
2010s historical drama films
Bangladeshi historical drama films
Films set in Bangladesh
Sheikh Hasina
Films about Sheikh Mujibur Rahman
2010s Bengali-language films
2018 drama films